Didianema is a genus of sea snails, marine gastropod mollusks in the family Skeneidae.

Older taxonomies categorized this genus in the family Trochidae or Turbinidae.

Species
Species within the genus Didianema include:
 Didianema pauli Pilsbry & McGinty, 1945

References

External links

 
Skeneidae
Monotypic gastropod genera